James L. Carter is an American film and television cinematographer.

Filmography
Ladder 49 (2004)
Sleepover (2004)
Tuck Everlasting (2002)
Zig Zag (2002)
The Shape of Things (2001)
Grand Avenue (1996)
Gunfighter's Moon (1995)
Destiny Turns on the Radio (1995)
Roadflower (1994)
My Dog Skip (2000)
Spaced Invaders (1990)
Leatherface: Texas Chainsaw Massacre III (1990)
Don't Answer the Phone! (1980)

References

Living people
American cinematographers
Year of birth missing (living people)